Jeffrey Victor Ravetch (born 1951) is a professor and head of the Laboratory of Molecular Genetics and Immunology at The Rockefeller University.

Background and training
Ravetch earned his B.S. degree at Yale University in 1973 in molecular biophysics and biochemistry working with Donald Crothers on the thermodynamic and kinetic properties of synthetic oligoribonucleotides. He received a Ph.D. from The Rockefeller University in 1978 in bacterial genetics working in the laboratory of Norton Zinder and Peter Model in the Laboratory of Genetics at Rockefeller and an M.D. from Cornell University Medical School in 1979. He completed postdoctoral studies at the National Institutes of Health with Philip Leder, where he identified and characterized the genes for human antibodies and the DNA elements involved in switch recombination. From 1982 to 1996 Dr. Ravetch was a member of the faculty of Memorial Sloan-Kettering Cancer Center and Cornell Medical College. Currently, Ravetch is the Theresa and Eugene M. Lang Professor in the Leonard Wagner Laboratory of Molecular Genetics and Immunology at The Rockefeller University.

Summary of research achievements
Ravetch revealed the mechanisms by which antibodies mediate and regulate their diverse in vivo effector functions through the characterization of the structural and functional diversity of the Fc region and their interactions with the family of Fc receptors he defined. His studies have focused on the redesign of antibodies to enhance their therapeutic capacity for the treatment of infectious, neoplastic and inflammatory diseases.

Selected honors and awards
 Member, National Academy of Sciences, 2006
 Recipient, William B. Coley Award, Cancer Research Institute, 2007
 Member, Institute of Medicine, 2007
 Recipient, Gairdner International Award, 2012
 Recipient, Sanofi-Institut Pasteur Award, 2012,
 Recipient, Honorary Doctorate, Friedrich-Alexander-University Erlangen-Nürnberg, 2013
 Recipient, Wolf Prize in Medicine, 2015
 Recipient, Ross Prize in Molecular Medicine, 2017
 Recipient, Robert Koch Medal and Award, 2018

References

1951 births
Living people
American immunologists
Rockefeller University faculty
Yale University alumni
Rockefeller University alumni
Weill Cornell Medical College alumni
Members of the National Academy of Medicine